Matt O'Mahoney (19 January 1913 – 1992) was an Irish footballer who played for, among others, Bristol Rovers and Ipswich Town. O'Mahoney was a dual international and played for both Ireland teams – the FAI XI and the IFA XI.

Club career

Early years
Before establishing himself at Bristol Rovers, O'Mahoney was something of an under achieving journeyman player. He had initially been on the books of several teams in the Merseyside area and had spent uninspiring spells at both Liverpool and New Brighton before eventually making something of a breakthrough at Southport, where he made 12 league appearances. He then joined Wolves but failed to make it into the first team. After a brief spell with Newport County, where he made 8 league appearances, he signed for Bristol Rovers in May 1936.

Bristol Rovers
Between 1936 and 1939 O'Mahoney went onto make 101 English League appearances, scoring 6 goals, for Bristol Rovers. He also made a further 4 appearances for Rovers in the FA Cup. O'Mahoney also won all 7 of his international caps while playing for Rovers. During the Second World War he returned to Rovers as a guest player and made 24 South West League appearances and scored 4 goals in the 1939–40 season. He also scored 1 Wartime cup goal for Rovers.

Ipswich Town
In July 1939 O'Mahoney signed for Ipswich Town. However within a few months the Second World War broke out and Town did not enter any of the wartime regional leagues. After playing just 3 league games for the club he returned to Bristol Rovers as a guest. During the 1940–41 season he also played 4 games for Bristol City in the Southern Regional Division and between 1942 and 1944 he guested regularly for Aberaman Athletic in the Football League West. O'Mahoney returned to Ipswich Town when they resumed playing in the 1945–46 season, making 36 league appearances and scoring 3 goals. During three more seasons with Town he made a further 58 appearances and scored 5 goals in the English League. He made his last appearance for Town on 16 October 1948 in a Third Division South game against Norwich City.

Irish international
When O'Mahoney began his international career in 1938 there were, in effect, two Ireland teams, chosen by two rival associations. Both associations, the Northern Ireland – based IFA and the Irish Free State – based FAI claimed jurisdiction over the whole of Ireland and selected players from the whole island. As a result, several notable Irish players from this era, including O'Mahoney, played for both teams.

FAI XI
Between 1938 and 1939 O'Mahoney played 6 times for the FAI XI. He made his first two appearances for the FAI XI in May 1938 during a European tour. On 18 May he played in a 2–2 draw with Czechoslovakia and then on 22 May he played in a 6–0 defeat against Poland. The highlight of his international career came during his third game against Switzerland on 18 September 1938. O'Mahoney earned the unusual distinction of becoming the first FAI XI international to fly in for a home game. He arrived from Bristol only an hour before kick-off, but proceeded to play superbly, helping the FAI XI to a 4–0 win. On 13 November 1938 he played in a winning FAI XI for the second time when he helped them beat Poland 3–2 in another home game. O'Mahoney made his final two appearances for the FAI XI in May 1939 during another European tour, helping them to 2–2 and 1–1 draws with Hungary and Germany respectively. These were the last two internationals that the FAI XI played before the start of the Second World War.

IFA XI
O'Mahoney made his 1 and only appearance for the IFA XI on 8 November 1938 in a 2–0 defeat against Scotland at Windsor Park. He had earned an IFA XI call up after his impressive performance for the FAI XI against Switzerland the previous month. He was the only debutant on the day and his teammates included fellow dual internationalists Tommy Breen, Jackie Brown, Jimmy McAlinden and Alex Stevenson.

Sources
The Boys in Green – The FAI International Story (1997): Sean Ryan 
Soccer at War – 1939 – 45 (2005): Jack Rollin

References

External links
Northern Ireland's Footballing Greats
Ireland (FAI) stats
  Ipswich Town fansite

1913 births
1992 deaths
English Football League players
Liverpool F.C. players
New Brighton A.F.C. players
Wolverhampton Wanderers F.C. players
Newport County A.F.C. players
Bristol Rovers F.C. players
Bristol Rovers F.C. wartime guest players
Ipswich Town F.C. players
Bristol City F.C. wartime guest players
Tranmere Rovers F.C. wartime guest players
Rochdale A.F.C. wartime guest players
Irish expatriate sportspeople in Wales
Republic of Ireland association footballers
Ireland (FAI) international footballers
Dual Irish international footballers
Pre-1950 IFA international footballers
Association footballers from County Kilkenny
Aberaman Athletic F.C. players
Association football defenders